Pine Prairie is a village in Evangeline Parish, Louisiana, United States. The population was 1,610 at the 2010 census, up from 1,087 in 2000.

Geography
Pine Prairie is located north of the center of Evangeline Parish at  (30.781882, -92.420852). Louisiana Highway 13 passes through the village, leading north  to Turkey Creek and south  to Mamou.

Pine Prairie Correctional Center is located in the northern part of the village. The village is also home to an ICE detention center where guards pepper sprayed over 100 immigrants for protesting their treatment and which also had an outbreak of mumps.

Demographics

As of the census of 2000, there were 1,087 people, 327 households, and 242 families residing in the village. The racial makeup of the village was 91.08% White, 7.36% African American, 0.09% Native American, 0.37% Asian, and 1.10% from two or more races. Hispanic or Latino of any race were 1.84% of the population.

There were 327 households, out of which 45.0% had children under the age of 18 living with them, 51.7% were married couples living together, 19.0% had a female householder with no husband present, and 25.7% were non-families. 25.1% of all households were made up of individuals, and 10.7% had someone living alone who was 65 years of age or older. The average household size was 2.64 and the average family size was 3.14.

In the village, the population was spread out, with 27.6% under the age of 18, 9.8% from 18 to 24, 28.4% from 25 to 44, 15.4% from 45 to 64, and 18.9% who were 65 years of age or older. The median age was 35 years. For every 100 females, there were 100.6 males. For every 100 females age 18 and over, there were 105.5 males.

The median income for a household in the village was $21,167, and the median income for a family was $27,292. Males had a median income of $32,375 versus $17,321 for females. The per capita income for the village was $9,735. About 24.2% of families and 29.2% of the population were below the poverty line, including 33.7% of those under age 18 and 22.8% of those age 65 or over.

Education
Public schools in Evangeline Parish are operated by the Evangeline Parish School Board. Pine Prairie High School is located in the village of Pine Prairie and serves students in grades pre-kindergarten through four as well as grades nine through twelve.

References

Villages in Louisiana
Villages in Evangeline Parish, Louisiana